is a Japanese football player who plays  as a goalkeeper for Sagan Tosu.

Playing career
Okamoto was born in Chiba on May 17, 1983. He joined J1 League club JEF United Ichihara (later JEF United Chiba) from youth team in 2002. However he could hardly play in the match behind Ryo Kushino and Tomonori Tateishi. He got an opportunity to play from 2006 and played many matches from 2008. However the club results were sluggish and finished at the bottom place in 2009 season. JEF United was relegated to J2 League from 2010 season. Although his opportunity to play decreased behind Kushino in 2010, Okamoto became a regular goalkeeper from 2011. However he lost his position in late 2014 and his opportunity to play decreased from 2015. In 2018, he moved to Ehime FC.

National team career
In November 2003, Okamoto was selected Japan U-20 national team for 2003 World Youth Championship. But he did not play in the match, as he was the team's reserve goalkeeper behind Eiji Kawashima.

Club statistics
.

1Includes A3 Champions Cup and Promotion Playoffs to J1.

Honors and awards
Team
J.League Cup Champion: 2005, 2006

References

External links

Profile at Ehime FC

1983 births
Living people
Association football people from Chiba Prefecture
Japanese footballers
J1 League players
J2 League players
JEF United Chiba players
Ehime FC players
Sagan Tosu players
Association football goalkeepers
Naturalized citizens of Japan
Japanese people of Korean descent